Women's "All-Ivy League" ice hockey teams have been formed from players at American universities in the Ivy League.

1999-2000
First Team All-Ivy League

2000-01
First Team All-Ivy League

2001-02

First Team All-Ivy League
  

Second Team All-Ivy League

Honorable Mention

Player of the Year
Carly Haggard (Junior), Dartmouth
Kristy Zamora (Senior), Brown
Rookie of the Year
Nicole Corriero (Freshman), Harvard

2002-03
First Team All-Ivy League

2003-04
First Team All-Ivy League

2004-05
First Team All-Ivy League

2005-06
First Team All-Ivy League

2006-07
First Team All-Ivy League

2007-08
First Team All-Ivy League

2008-09
First Team All-Ivy League

References

See also
National Collegiate Women's Ice Hockey Championship

Ice
+
College women's ice hockey in the United States
List of Ivy